Yaroslav Vladimirovich may refer to:

 Yaroslav I the Wise, Grand Prince of Kievan Rus, son of Vladimir I of Kiev
 Yaroslav Osmomysl, Prince of Halych, son of Volodymyrko of Halych